In organic chemistry, a cyclo[n]carbon (or simply cyclocarbon) is a chemical compound consisting solely of a number n of carbon atoms covalently linked in a ring. Since the compounds are composed only of carbon atoms, they are allotropes of carbon. Possible bonding patterns include all double bonds (a cyclic cumulene) or alternating single bonds and triple bonds (a cyclic polyyne).

As of 2020, the only cyclocarbon that has been synthesized is cyclo[18]carbon.

Cyclo[3]carbon

The (hypothetical) three-carbon member of this family is also called cyclopropatriene.

Cyclo[6]carbon

The (hypothetical) six-carbon member of this family is also called benzotriyne.

Cyclo[18]carbon

The smallest cyclo[n]carbon predicted to be thermodynamically stable is C18, with a computed strain energy of 72 kilocalories per mole.  An IBM/Oxford team claimed to synthesize its molecules in solid state in 2019:

According to these IBM researchers, the synthesized cyclocarbon has alternating triple and single bonds, rather than being made of entirely of double bonds. This supposedly makes this molecule a semiconductor.

Large cyclo[n]carbons
Seenithurai & Chai 2020 found that larger cyclo[n]carbons [up to 100 carbon atoms] exhibit polyradical character and report linear carbon chains (l-CC[n]) as well as cyclic carbon chain or cyclo[n] carbon (c-CC[n]), where n=10-100. For all the cases investigated, l-CC[n] and c-CC[n] are ground-state singlets, and c-CC[n] are energetically more stable than l-CC[n]. The electronic properties of l-CC[n] and c-CC[n] display peculiar oscillation patterns for smaller values of n, followed by monotonic changes for larger values of n. For the smaller carbon chains, odd-numbered l-CC[n] are more stable than the adjacent even-numbered ones, and c-CC[4m+2]/c-CC[4m] (where m are positive integers) are more/less stable than the adjacent odd-numbered ones. With the increase of n, l-CC[n] and c-CC[n] possess increasing polyradical nature in their ground states, with the active orbitals being delocalized over the entire length of l-CC[n] or the whole circumference of c-CC[n].

On the basis of TAO-LDA results, the smaller c-CC[n] (up to  = 22, where m are positive integers) possess nonradical nature and sizable singlet-triplet energy gaps (e.g., larger than 20 kcal/mol). In view of their high stability, it can be anticipated that these relatively stable cyclic carbon chains, such as c-CC[10], c-CC[14], c-CC[18], and c-CC[22], are likely to be synthesized in the near future. Among them, c-CC[18] (i.e. cyclo[18]carbon) has been recently synthesized by an IBM/Oxford team in 2019.

References 

Allotropes of carbon